Patrick Rémy (born 25 August 1954) is French former professional football player and manager.

Career
He played for Metz, Auxerre and Marseille.

He coached Beauvais, Sedan, Gent, Caen and Guingamp.

He joined Troyes AC in June 2009 and was dismissed in June 2010, despite managing promotion to Ligue 2.

References

Living people
1954 births
Association football forwards
French footballers
French football managers
FC Metz players
AJ Auxerre players
Olympique de Marseille players
Ligue 1 players
Ligue 2 players
AS Beauvais Oise managers
CS Sedan Ardennes managers
K.A.A. Gent managers
Stade Malherbe Caen managers
En Avant Guingamp managers
ES Troyes AC managers
Ligue 1 managers